Nicolás Bruzzone (born October 24, 1985) is an Argentine rugby sevens former player. He initially missed out on Olympic selection but was a late addition to the Argentine squad after injury woes to Javier Rojas and Rodrigo Etchart.

Bruzzone set a national record as the most capped sevens player.

References

External links 
 
 
 
 
 ARU Profile

1985 births
Living people
Male rugby sevens players
Argentine rugby union players
Olympic rugby sevens players of Argentina
Argentina international rugby sevens players
Rugby sevens players at the 2016 Summer Olympics
Pan American Games medalists in rugby sevens
Pan American Games silver medalists for Argentina
Rugby sevens players at the 2011 Pan American Games
Medalists at the 2011 Pan American Games
Medalists at the 2015 Pan American Games